The Phoenix Fire Department provides fire protection and emergency medical services for the city of Phoenix, Arizona. The department responded to 186,594 calls during 2014–2015, with 88% being for emergency medical services.

History
The Phoenix Fire Department was established as a volunteer fire department on August 17, 1886, with the formation of Engine 1. In 1922 the department transitioned from volunteers to career members. From 1924 to present day, the department created the A, B, and C shifts, which started and ended every third day at 8:00 AM.

On Dec. 9, 1929, the Phoenix Fire Department suffered its first fatality in the line of duty. While responding to a call, Squad 1 and Engine 2 crashed into each other at 14th and Van Buren streets. Captain Jack Sullivan of Squad 1 was killed immediately.

In 1936 the Phoenix Fire Department joined the International Association of Firefighters and formed the union Local 493. The surrounding fire departments, Tempe, Glendale, Chandler, Surprise, and Peoria, are also part of Local 493.

On Jun. 5, 2021 the Phoenix Fire Department responded to a fire at around 35th Ave and Lincoln St. The strength of the fire grew quickly from a 2 alarm fire, which it then skipped to a 4 alarm fire, which then grew to a 5 alarm fire, after that it grew finally to a 6 alarm fire with more than 150 firefighters on scene. To this day this was the largest response of the Phoenix Fire Department with more than 10 different agencies from across Arizona and even 200+ firefighters. Source

Stations & apparatus 
The fire department battalions are listed here. Some fire stations have two engine companies. In February 2020, the fire department opened the 9th Battalion in the Central District. Each Battalion is commanded by a Battalion Chief and each District is commanded by a District Chief.

Battalion 1 (Central District)

Battalion 2 (East District)

Battalion 3 (West District)

Battalion 4 (North District)

Battalion 5 (South District)

Battalion 6 (East District)

Battalion 7 (South District)

Battalion 8 (North District)

Battalion 9 (Central District)

Battalion 19 (Aviation District)

Resource Management

Closure of South Deputy and North Deputy 
In February 2020, the Phoenix Fire Department closed the South Deputy Chief and the North Deputy Chief which staffed senior command officers that were shift commanders. The functions of both North and South Deputy Chiefs were absorbed with Battalion 1 and Battalion 4. The Phoenix Fire Department then opened Central Deputy Chief to replace Battalion 8's role. Now, shift commanders are Central Deputy, Battalion Chief 1, Battalion Chief 4, District Chief 1, District Chief 2, District Chief 3, District Chief 4, District Chief 5 and District Chief 19.

FEMA Urban Search and Rescue (US&R) Team Arizona Task Force 
The Phoenix-based FEMA Urban Search and Rescue Team Arizona Task Force 1 (or AZ-TF1) is a FEMA Urban Search and Rescue Task Force sponsored by the Phoenix Fire Department.

AZ-TF1 is one of 28 such FEMA US&R Rescue Teams with numerous disaster response capabilities such as search and rescue, hazardous material detection and decontamination, structural collapse rescue, technical search, emergency triage and medicine, live find and human remains detection canines, and disaster recovery. The Federal Emergency Management Agency created the geographically positioned teams in an effort to provide support for large-scale disasters in both the United States and the potential international response abroad.  In recent years the FEMA US&R system has developed the ability for a modular response in the event a specific capability is needed during a disaster response.  An example of this would be a swift-water rescue team needed to augment the current search and rescue assets already deployed.  FEMA provides the financial, technical and training support for all 28 teams as well as manage an internal auditing system to verify and validate each team's ability to provide a standardized response of both personnel and equipment.

Deployments
Noteworthy AZ-TF1 deployments include:
 1994 Northridge earthquake, Los Angeles County, California
 1995 Oklahoma City bombing, Oklahoma City, Oklahoma 
  2001 World Trade Center, New York City, New York
 2002 Winter Olympics, Salt Lake City, Utah 
 2003 Space Shuttle Columbia disaster 
 2005 Hurricane Katrina 
 2008 Hurricane Ike/Gustav
 2014 Oso mudslide
 2017 Hurricane Harvey/Irma/Maria
 2018 Hurricane Florence

See also 

 Hall of Flame Fire Museum

References

External links
 Phoenix Fire Department Twitter
 Phoenix Fire Department Regional Dispatch Center incident listing
 Phoenix Fire Foundation
 Arizona Search Dogs

Fire Department
Fire departments in Arizona
Ambulance services in the United States
Medical and health organizations based in Arizona
Arizona 1
Organizations based in Phoenix, Arizona